Rainych Ran (born October 20, 1992), better known mononymously as Rainych, is the pseudonym of an Indonesian singer and YouTuber. She is notable for her renditions of city pop, vocaloid, anime and J-pop songs, such as "Mayonaka no Door" and "Plastic Love". She is also known for her Japanese covers of English songs, such as "Say So" and "Blinding Lights", which have been praised by both their original singers, Doja Cat and The Weeknd respectively.

Early life 
Rainych Ran was born on October 20, 1992, in West Sumatra. She began singing when she was in elementary school and showed an interest in anime and manga as a teenager. Before gaining attention as a YouTuber, she taught robotics at a vocational school.

Career

2015–2018: Early career 
Rainych struggled with various life problems and depression until the end of 2015, but she created her YouTube channel on May 27, 2015 (JST) and began uploading renditions of Japanese song covers on YouTube from her bedroom starting in 2016. By the end of 2018, her YouTube channel had only about 9,000 subscribers, yet she remained grateful. She manifested her appreciation and happiness by expressing her thanks to the fans that supported on her Facebook page.

2019–2020: Rise to prominence 
Rainych did not show her face in her uploads until early 2019, when she released a rendition of the theme song to the anime Dororo. Her covers of hit songs, such as "Lemon" and "Gurenge" achieved millions of views, and her rendition of "Omae wa Mou" became a hit. On November 18, 2019 (JST), via her indie label Sprite:Wall, she released her first single for the global market, a Japanese-English song entitled "Time-Lapse".

In March 2020, she released a Japanese cover version of Doja Cat's single "Say So" in a style reminiscent of 80's city pop, which catapulted her into an anti-mainstream recognition. Translated by fellow YouTuber Datenkou, the video became viral and gained the attention of Doja Cat while on an Instagram livestream after a fan suggested that she listen to Rainych's cover of "Say So". Doja Cat praised her during livestream, calling her voice "beautiful". Rainych expressed her appreciation on Twitter and conveyed her gratitude to the fan who suggested the song. Her cover of "Plastic Love" also attracted attention, garnering coverage from Japanese media. On August 23, 2020, she appeared on the NHK-BS program Cool Japan ~Hakkutsu! Kakkoī Nippon~, where she performed her cover of  "Mayonaka no Door." In August, she also shared her Japanese rendition of The Weeknd's song "Blinding Lights" which received praise from The Weeknd himself on his SNS.

2020–present: Debut in Japan 

With praise heaped on by Doja Cat and The Weeknd, Rainych's career path has surfaced to the Japanese market. On October 2, 2020 (JST), she made her Japanese debut with the remix of her cover of "Say So" by Tofubeats, following her announcement in the preceding days. On October 29, 2020, she uploaded a cover of Miki Matsubara's 1979 song "Mayonaka no Door", which was arranged by Natsuki Harada of Evening Cinema, with the cover gaining popularity in Indonesia. The cover led people to rediscover the original, and is attributed by Billboard as the reason the original gained popularity throughout the rest of the world. On December 11, 2020, she covered Momoko Kikuchi's song "Blind Curve", and was praised by Momoko Kikuchi herself.

On January 26, 2021, TikTok Japan announced that Rainych was chosen as a guest of the TikTok LIVE "Show What な Night" on January 30, 2021.

On March 22, 2021, Sony Music Japan announced Rainych's first EP, consisting of 7-inch custom pink vinyl covers of "Mayonaka no Door" and "Blind Curve". Several days later, she released a cover of Tatsuro Yamashita's song "Ride on Time". Her first EP officially released on May 26, 2021, and quickly sold out at Sony Music Shop and other Japanese music stores. As a result, it peaked at No. 49 on the Oricon charts. On June 23, 2021, Sony Music Japan announced Rainych's second EP, which was a 7-inch vinyl record entitled "RIDE ON TIME / Say So -Japanese Version- (tofubeats Remix)". It was officially released on August 28, 2021.

In early January 2022, Rainych released "Kanashimi wo Yasashisa ni" cover version to participate in the 20th anniversary of the anime series Naruto. In March 2022, she confirmed her collaboration in Maki Nomiya's self-cover project, entitled "Sweet Soul Revue," which was reported by media in the preceding days before being confirmed.

Public image 
Rainych has been praised for her appearances; Jane Su and Mika Horii of TBS Radio both described her in a single word as "kawaii". Furthermore, Jane Su has also specifically noted Rainych as "a girl with shiny mochi-like skin". Her vocals and musicality has been noted for being "sophisticated". The media has represented her voice as cute, light, unique and transparent, and she has been referred to as an utahime ("diva", "song princess") and a "cover monster". Saito Takashi of Meiji University described her Japanese language songs as being brilliant, fresh, and surprising.

Rainych has often been cited as an influencer within the music industry. Yoshihiro Kawasaki of Pony Canyon attributed Rainych's fame to her enormous influence, and stated that she had brought to the forefront anew some of the greatest Japanese works through her voice and character. According to Noriko Ashizawa of Spotify Japan, her figure has a direct connection with the current popularity of city pop, particularly in Indonesia, where there is a high affinity with Japanese culture and J-pop culture. Kento Nakajima of Sexy Zone has cited Rainych as his "favorite painter", and also stated that she is an artist who draws city pop style paintings and currently attracting a lot of attention in Japan. Not only her popularity burst in Japan but also Rainych's popularity spans almost the entire world; she has fans in more than 100 countries.

Musical style and influences 
Through her works, she is known as a J-pop singer. Her musical style has been recognized as city pop, alongside other genres for other covers. With reflecting on the release Japanese covers of "Say So" and "Blinding Lights" in 2020, her musical style more expanded, and bind the Japanese and US market. Her themes indirectly is represented by the J-pop culture that has affected her. Rainych has cited Reol and LiSA as a particular influence artists. Additionally, she is heavily influenced by Reol, as stated in interviews with the Magic Rain and Netorabo, and is influenced by the Indonesian  community, the "Japanese sound" and Vocaloid culture. Not only in terms of "Japanese songs". Rainych has also incorporated K-pop elements into her vocals and visual style, sang a cover of a Mandarin song, and sang a traditional Indonesian song in a livestream.

Personal life 
Rainych speaks English and Indonesian, along with several Indonesian regional languages, such as Minangkabau. In several interviews and a livestream, Rainych has stated that she keeps her personal life private. In an interview with Withnews and J-Wave News, Rainych makes a serious effort to protect her privacy by not revealing any details about where currently she lives. Although her YouTube videos have attracted a lot of worldwide attention, she has not fully disclosed her activities to anyone except her family and immediate neighbors. In an interview with NNA ASIA, it was revealed that due to restrictions stemming from the COVID-19 pandemic, Rainych has spent most of her time at home without going out.

Other ventures

Sponsorships 
Rainych has been sponsored by miHoYo and Riot Games in relation to the video games Honkai Impact 3 and League of Legends.

Appearances in other media 
In addition to performing on her own YouTube channel. Rainych has also made appearances on other YouTube channels and other websites, and has often collaborated with international artists; for instance, in May 2020, she participated in an online collaboration project with overseas YouTube creators, titled "Gurenge – Demon Slayer (Opening)｜Band Cover".

During 2020–2022, Rainych became a source of news not only on numerous Japanese television networks (TBS, NHK, Fuji TV, Kansai TV and Nippon TV), but also on various Japanese radio stations.

Critical reception 
As a singer and YouTuber, Rainych has been hailed as a prominent figure with notable receptions. In 2020, Miki Matsubara's "Mayonaka no Door" (1979) peaked on the Spotify Global Viral Chart for 15 consecutive days, and reached the top ranking on Apple's J-pop music chart in 12 countries, triggered by the release of Rainych's cover in October that year, and the cover being featured as Tiktok's BGM. 
Since its initial publication in October 2020, her cover video has garnered more than 7 million views. Kazunari Imai of Pony Canyon remarked that this was a "classical synergistic hit" when "Mayonaka no Door" became one of the most iconic events in music streaming history.

Discography

Extended plays

Singles

As lead artist 

Notes

As featured artist

Remixes

References

Web sources

Primary video and playlist sources 
In the text these references are preceded by a double dagger (‡):

Indonesian pop singers
Indonesian YouTubers
Living people
Indonesian Muslims
Indonesian scientists
People from Sumatra
People from Riau
People from West Sumatra
Minangkabau people
Production sound mixers
Music YouTubers
Cover artists
Sony Music Entertainment Japan artists
1992 births
Indonesian-language singers
Japanese-language singers
English-language singers from Indonesia
Vietnamese-language singers
FL Studio users